William Charles Devenish is a former competitive swimmer of the 1960s and 1970s.

A Sydney native, Devenish attended Westfields Sports High School and was a dominant swimmer in the Combined Schools competition, holding all possible freestyle records.

Devenish claimed three gold medals at the 1967 national titles in Adelaide and the following year came fourth in the 400 metres freestyle at the national titles, where a podium placing was needed for selection to the Mexico City Olympics.

In 1970, Devenish secured a bronze medal in the 100 metres freestyle at the 1970 British Commonwealth Games in Edinburgh and won two relay golds, including a world record breaking performance in the 4 x 200 metres freestyle.

References

Year of birth missing (living people)
Living people
Australian male freestyle swimmers
People educated at Westfields Sports High School
Swimmers from Sydney
Commonwealth Games gold medallists for Australia
Commonwealth Games bronze medallists for Australia
Commonwealth Games medallists in swimming
Medallists at the 1970 British Commonwealth Games
Swimmers at the 1970 British Commonwealth Games